This article lists places worldwide where relatively high birth rates of twins were documented:

Villages or Towns "Towns of Twins"

States
In 2008, Massachusetts has emerged as the most prolific producer of multiple births in the United States. The state has a twin birth rate of 4.5 for every 100 live births, compared with a national rate of 3.2.

Countries
There is  publicly available, peer edited, cited literature to rank the twinning rate by country. www.livescience.com has an article related to this, but article’s only citation is the authors previous opinion article.

See also
:Category:Populated places with highest incidence of multiple birth

References